

58001–58100 

|-id=084
| 58084 Hiketaon || 1197 T-3 || Hiketaon, one of the elders of Troy, counselors to Priam; the son of Laomedon, he suggested Helen be returned to Menelaus to avoid the Trojan war || 
|-id=095
| 58095 Oranienstein || 1973 SN || Oranienstein, a baroque castle on the Lahn river near Diez, Germany || 
|-id=096
| 58096 Oineus ||  || Oeneus, king of Calydonia, son of Porthaon, who sent Meleager out to find heroes to kill the Calydonian Boar; his grandson Diomedes avoided fighting Glaukos because of the friendship between Oeneus and Glaukos' grandfather Bellerophon || 
|-id=097
| 58097 Alimov ||  || Alexandr Fyodorovich Alimov, Russian founder of the school of functional ecology and president of the Hydrobiological Society || 
|-id=098
| 58098 Quirrenbach || 1977 TC || Andreas Quirrenbach, German astronomer, director of the Landessternwarte Heidelberg-Königstuhl (Königstuhl Observatory) since 2006 || 
|}

58101–58200 

|-id=152
| 58152 Natsöderblom ||  || Nathan Söderblom (Lars Olof Jonathan Söderblom), Swedish archbishop, theologian and Peace Nobelist || 
|-id=163
| 58163 Minnesang ||  || Minnesang, German sung poetry of the 12th and 13th centuries || 
|-id=164
| 58164 Reiwanohoshi ||  || Following the April 2019 abdication of Japan's Heisei Emperor, the new Reiwa Era began. As "Reiwa" means peace and harmony, "Reiwanohoshi" ("the star of Reiwa") is named to symbolize Japan going into a new peaceful era, free of natural disasters. || 
|-id=184
| 58184 Masayukiyamamoto ||  || Masayuki Yamamoto (born 1971), a Japanese planetary scientist. || 
|-id=185
| 58185 Rokkosan ||  || Rokkosan is a 1000-meter-high mountain behind the city of Kobe, Japan || 
|-id=186
| 58186 Langkavel ||  || Arno Langkavel (born 1938), a former high school teacher and historian of astronomy. || 
|-id=191
| 58191 Dolomiten ||  || The Dolomites mountains (Dolomiten is the Swiss-German name) || 
|-id=196
| 58196 Ashleyess ||  || Ashley Caroline Steel, the discoverer's youngest sister || 
|}

58201–58300 

|-id=214
| 58214 Amorim ||  || Regina Helena Caldas de Amorim, Brazilian neuro-pediatrician at Belo Horizonte (Minas Gerais) || 
|-id=215
| 58215 von Klitzing ||  || Klaus von Klitzing, German physicist and Nobelist || 
|-id=217
| 58217 Peterhebel ||  || Peter Hebel (born 1957) is a most interested amateur astronomer, but as a doctor of medicine his chief occupation is that of an operating surgeon at the Medical University of Graz, Austria, where he has saved and improved the life of many patients. || 
|-id=221
| 58221 Boston ||  || Boston, founded in 1630 by Puritan settlers from England, is the capital and largest city of the American state of Massachusetts. || 
|-id=279
| 58279 Kamerlingh ||  || Heike Kamerlingh Onnes, 19th–20th-century Dutch physicist, who first liquefied helium || 
|}

58301–58400 

|-id=345
| 58345 Moomintroll ||  || Moomintroll is the central character of the classic 1946 novel Comet in Moominland (Swedish title Kometjakten) by Finnish author Tove Jansson || 
|-id=364
| 58364 Feierberg ||  || Michael Feierberg, American astronomer, who was involved in the early work connecting C-class minor planets to carbonaceous chondrites || 
|-id=365
| 58365 Robmedrano || 1995 OQ || Technical Sergeant Rob Medrano, of the Air Force Maui Optical and Supercomputing (AMOS) observatory || 
|-id=373
| 58373 Albertoalonso || 1995 SR || Alberto Alonso, the legendary Cuban choreographer and dance visionary || 
|}

58401–58500 

|-id=417
| 58417 Belzoni ||  || Giovanni Battista Belzoni, an explorer of Egyptian antiquities. || 
|-id=418
| 58418 Luguhu ||  || Luguhu Lake is situated at the junction of southwestern Sichuan and northwestern Yunnan || 
|-id=424
| 58424 Jamesdunlop ||  || James Dunlop, Scottish-Australian astronomer || 
|-id=440
| 58440 Zdeněkstuchlík || 1996 HV || Zdeněk Stuchlík (born 1950) is a Czech theoretical physicist and astrophysicist, fine art photographer and professor at the Silesian University in Opava. His field of research is relativistic astrophysics and cosmology, in particular with focus on compact objects like black holes and neutron stars. || 
|-id=441
| 58441 Thomastestoni ||  || Thomas Testoni (born 1984) is a tourist services technician and a computer store manager. He is the son-in-law of one of the co-discoverers of this minor planet. || 
|-id=460
| 58460 Le Mouélic ||  || Stephane Le Mouélic, a research engineer at the University of Nantes. || 
|-id=466
| 58466 Santoka ||  || Santoka Taneda, the Japanese "Wandering Haiku Poet" || 
|-id=495
| 58495 Hajin ||  || Ha Jin is the pen name of Xuefei Jin (born 1956), a Chinese-American writer, poet and essayist. His 1999 novel Waiting received the National Book Award for Fiction and the PEN/Faulkner Award. He currently teaches at Boston University (MA). || 
|-id=498
| 58498 Octaviopaz || 1996 VF || Octavio Paz Lozano (1914–1998) was a Mexican poet and essayist, who won the Nobel Prize for Literature in 1990. || 
|-id=499
| 58499 Stüber || 1996 VY || Eberhard Stüber, Austrian director of the natural science museum "Haus der Natur" in Salzburg || 
|}

58501–58600 

|-id=534
| 58534 Logos ||  || Logos and Zoe ((58534) Logos I Zoe), a paired emanation of the deity in the Gnostic tradition, and part of its creation myth || 
|-id=535
| 58535 Pattillo || 1997 DP || Leonard Pattillo, American founding member and former officer of the Fort Bend Astronomy Club || 
|-id=569
| 58569 Eboshiyamakouen ||  || Eboshiyama Kouen, the name of the park in the southern part of Nanyo city, Yamagata. || 
|-id=572
| 58572 Romanella ||  || Russell Romanella (born 1958) is an experienced space engineer involved in human space exploration activities such as the Space Shuttle, International Space Station and Constellation projects || 
|-id=573
| 58573 Serpieri ||  || Arrigo Serpieri, Italian agricultural economist || 
|-id=578
| 58578 Žídek ||  || Ivo Žídek, Czech opera singer † || 
|-id=579
| 58579 Ehrenberg ||  || Eleonora Gayerová z Ehrenberku (Eleonora Gayerová of Ehrenberg), Czech soprano opera singer, who lived in Vila Leonora at Ondřejov and was instrumental in the establishment of the Ondřejov Observatory † ‡ || 
|-id=580
| 58580 Elenacuoghi ||  || Elena Cuoghi (born 1990) is a European Languages and Cultures graduate of the University of Modena. She is the daughter-in-law of the discoverer of this minor planet. || 
|-id=595
| 58595 Joepollock ||  || Joseph T. Pollock (born 1950), a professor of astronomy at the Appalachian State University, Boone, North Carolina. || 
|-id=600
| 58600 Iwamuroonsen ||  || Iwamuroonsen is a town of the southwest of Niigata City  || 
|}

58601–58700 

|-id=605
| 58605 Liutungsheng ||  || Liu Tungsheng, Chinese Earth scientist and academician of the Chinese Academy of Sciences || 
|-id=607
| 58607 Wenzel || 1997 UL || Wolfgang Wenzel, German astronomer † || 
|-id=608
| 58608 Geroldrichter || 1997 UY || Gerold A. Richter, German astronomer † || 
|-id=622
| 58622 Setoguchi || 1997 VU || Takashi Setoguchi (born 1961) is a member of the Oriental Astronomical Association. || 
|-id=627
| 58627 Rieko ||  || Rieko is the wife of the discoverer. || 
|-id=664
| 58664 IYAMMIX ||  || The International Year of Astronomy (IYA 2009) is a global effort initiated by the IAU and UNESCO to stimulate worldwide interest in astronomy under the central theme "The Universe, Yours to Discover" || 
|-id=671
| 58671 Diplodocus ||  || one of the largest animals ever to walk on the earth, the Dashing Diplodocus is the premier quarterly publication of the Houston Museum of Natural Science. || 
|-id=672
| 58672 Remigio ||  || Scarfi Remigio, Italian geologist, mathematics teacher, and amateur astronomer || 
|-id=679
| 58679 Brenig || 1998 AH || Brenig, a part of Bornheim, is located near the Rhine river between Cologne and Bonn. || 
|-id=682
| 58682 Alenašolcová ||  || Alena Šolcová, Czech mathematician and historian of mathematics and astronomy || 
|-id=691
| 58691 Luigisannino ||  || Luigi Sannino (born 1981) is an Italian amateur astronomer, studying comets and asteroids. || 
|}

58701–58800 

|-id=707
| 58707 Kyoshi || 1998 CS || Kyoshi Takahama, Japanese Haiku poet and novelist || 
|-id=709
| 58709 Zenocolò ||  || Zeno Colò, 20th-century Italian skier and Olympic gold medalist (Oslo Winter Games, 1952) || 
|}

58801–58900 

|-id=896
| 58896 Schlosser ||  || Wolfhard Schlosser, professor at Bochum University from 1969 until his retirement in 2005 || 
|}

58901–59000 

|-id=931
| 58931 Palmys ||  || Palmys, a Trojan fighting for the relief of the city of Troy set off for the centre of the battlefield, with a group of other Trojans from Ascania. || 
|-id=000
| 59000 Beiguan ||  || Beijing Planetarium (Beijing Tianwenguan), on the occasion of its fiftieth anniversary year (2007) || 
|}

References 

058001-059000